Fyodor Sergeyevich Arsentyev (born 17 February 1999) is a Russian football player.

Club career
He made his debut in the Russian Football National League for FC Neftekhimik Nizhnekamsk on 13 November 2016 in a game against FC Khimki.

References

External links
 
 Profile by Russian Football National League
 

1999 births
Living people
Russian footballers
Association football goalkeepers
FC Neftekhimik Nizhnekamsk players
FC Rubin Kazan players
FC Volga Ulyanovsk players
Sportspeople from Tatarstan